Telmatobius hauthali is a species of frog in the family Telmatobiidae.
It is endemic to Argentina.
Its natural habitat is geothermal wetlands.
It is threatened by habitat loss which may lead to its extinction.

References

hauthali
Amphibians of the Andes
Amphibians of Argentina
Endemic fauna of Argentina
Taxonomy articles created by Polbot
Amphibians described in 1895
Taxa named by Julio Germán Koslowsky